'''Public holidays in

References

Ecuador
Ecuadorian culture
Holidays
Ecuador
Ecuador